Fishtail is a small unincorporated community in Stillwater County, Montana, United States.  It is located on the West Rosebud River. Its post office was established on February 15, 1901 with Charles Sullivan as its first postmaster. It has a zip code of 59028.

History
The community of Fishtail was established in 1892. It was platted in 1913.

Fishtail was affected by the 2022 Montana floods when the Stillwater River flooded.

Demographics

References

Unincorporated communities in Stillwater County, Montana
Unincorporated communities in Montana